The Cloquet River is a  river in Minnesota, United States. It is the main tributary of the Saint Louis River.

Name
Cloquet River is known in the Ojibwe language as the Gaa-biitootigweyaag-ziibi ("River that parallels the Saint Louis River"). On the map of Stephen H. Long's expedition in 1823, it shows that stream as "Rapid River", and it is unnamed on the map by David Thompson in 1826 for the proposed routes of the international boundary. However, on the 1843 Joseph N. Nicollet map, the river is identified by its present name.

Geography
The Cloquet River generally flows in a southwesterly direction through Indian Lake, Alden Lake, and Island Lake, before emptying into the Saint Louis River.

One can separate the river into two primary stretches, the upper stretch beginning at Cloquet Lake in Lake County as a small stream and ending at Island Lake.

Tributaries of the Cloquet River include the Us-kab-wan-ka River, the Beaver River, and Little Cloquet River.

See also
List of rivers of Minnesota
List of longest streams of Minnesota

References

 Minnesota Watersheds
 USGS Hydrologic Unit Map - State of Minnesota (1974)

Rivers of Minnesota
Rivers of Lake County, Minnesota
Rivers of St. Louis County, Minnesota